Desh Re Joya Dada Pardesh Joya is a 1998 Indian Gujarati film directed by Govindbhai Patel. It is one of the highest grossing Gujarati film of all time.

Plot
Ram (Hiten Kumar) and Radha (Roma Manek) are childhood sweethearts, but are separated when Ram and his widowed mother relocates to another village with his uncle. They are reunited when Ram attends Radha's sister's wedding as the groom's cousin. Meanwhile, Radha's elder brother marries the just-back-from-America Rita (Pinky Parikh) without the consent of his parents.

Ram and Radha fall in love once again and they are engaged, much to the chagrin of Rita, who wanted Radha to marry her brother Deepak instead. On the way to the wedding Ram gets killed in an accident and Radha is heart-broken. But Ram is not actually dead, but instead kidnapped by the jealous family members and replaced by another dead body to make it look like him. Rita tries to poison Radha and tries to blame on Sharda, but Radha defends Sharda and rightly blames Rita for this. Rita then falsely accuses Sharda's husband of trying to rape her. Allegations and counter-allegations follow and Dadaji (Arvind Trivedi) decides to split the property and separate brothers. Radha's brother Deepak intervenes and exposes her sister Rita as the conspirator. However, it turns out that this was a ploy to paint Deepak in a good light. Radha's family falls for the trap and agrees to get Radha married to Deepak. Radha, still heart-broken, reluctantly agrees to marry Deepak. Ram escapes from his captors, but it's too late as Radha is already married to Deepak and flown off to America. Rajesh overhears Rita confessing her role in the conspiracy and threatens to expel her from the family. Ram also reaches the house and the whole conspiracy is unveiled to the family. Rita feels guilty and has a change of heart and accuses her elders of maligning her life.

Radha receives culture shock when she reaches America with Deepak and has trouble adjusting with her abusive alcoholic husband. Her in-laws are impressed with her values and her dedication and informs her parents about her true condition with her husband and recommend that they take her back to India. Rita takes it upon herself to bring her back. In America, one of Deepak's friend tries to misbehave with Radha and in ensuing fight, Deepak falls from the first floor and dies as the result. Radha returns to India, but her troubles are not at the end. Deepak's uncle and other conspirators again try to kidnap her, but timely intervention of Ram saves the situation from worsening, but in the fight Dadaji gets mortally wounded from a gunshot. In his dying breath, Dadaji reunites Ram and Radha.

Cast
 Hiten Kumar as Ram
 Roma Manek as Radha
 Arvind Trivedi as Dadaji
 Rajdeep as Rajesh
 Pinky Parikh as Rita
 Sameer Rajda
 Bhumika Sheth
 Devendra Pandit
 Ramesh Mehta as Dahyo

Soundtrack

Music for the film was composed by Arvind Barot.

Release
It's still the 2nd highest grossing Gujarati film.

See also
 List of highest-grossing Gujarati films

References

External links
 
 

1998 films
1990s Gujarati-language films